Ashtjeran (also Romanized as Ashtjerān; also known as Dashtjerān) is a village in Howmeh Rural District, in the Central District of Sarab County, East Azerbaijan Province, Iran. At the 2006 census, its population was 522, in 124 families.

References 

Populated places in Sarab County